Syritta fasciata is a species of syrphid fly in the family Syrphidae.

Distribution
Aldabra, Ethiopia, Guinea-Bissau, Kenya.

References

Eristalinae
Diptera of Africa
Insects described in 1830